Robert George Friedrichs (August 30, 1906 – April 15, 1997) was a pitcher in Major League Baseball. He played for the Washington Senators.

References

External links

1906 births
1997 deaths
Major League Baseball pitchers
Washington Senators (1901–1960) players
Baseball players from Cincinnati
Beckley Black Knights players
Dayton Ducks players
Omaha Packers players
Springfield Ponies players
Terre Haute Tots players
Youngstown Buckeyes players